Kevin Paul Shoemake (born 28 January 1965, in Widford) is an English former professional footballer who played in the Football League, as a goalkeeper.
 
He is Chief Executive of Birmingham FA, UEFA B Licence coach & FA Tutor, Premier League Match Delegate. He has a full-time career as a Head of Business Development at the Chartered Institute of Logistics and Transport in Corby, as well as providing the BBC live-text on match days. On 1 February 2011, it was announced that he was to become the chief executive officer of the Northamptonshire FA with effect from 21 February 2011. On 1 June 2018 he became CEO of Birmingham County Football Association

References

Sources
Profile at Neil Brown

1965 births
Living people
People from Wickford
English footballers
Association football goalkeepers
Leyton Orient F.C. players
Harlow Town F.C. players
Chelmsford City F.C. players
Welling United F.C. players
Peterborough United F.C. players
Kettering Town F.C. players
Rushden & Diamonds F.C. players
Nuneaton Borough F.C. players
English Football League players
Redbridge Forest F.C. players